Laurence James Bauer  (born 9 August 1949) is a British linguist and Emeritus Professor of Linguistics at Victoria University of Wellington. He is known for his expertise on morphology and word formation. Bauer was an editor of the journal Word Structure. In 2017 he was awarded the Royal Society of New Zealand's Humanities medal.

Life
Laurie was brought up in Yorkshire, where his parents moved when he was six years old. He attended King James’s Grammar School and was then accepted at Edinburgh in 1967 to do a course in French Language with General Linguistics and Phonetics. In the second year, he started linguistics. Bauer was admitted as a PhD student in October 1972. He finished his PhD in 1975 and started teaching in the English Department at Odense University, Denmark. He married Winifred Bauer in 1976.

He's one of the contributors to The Cambridge grammar of the English language.

Books
Andersen, Erik & Laurie Bauer 1975. Engelske Udtaleøvelser ('English Pronunciation Exercises'). With accompanying tapes. Copenhagen: Gyldendal
 The Grammar of Nominal Compounding with special reference to Danish, English and French, Odense University Press, 1978
 American English Pronunciation, with J.M. Dienhart, H.H. Hartvigson & L. Kvistgaard Jakobsen, Copenhagen: Gyldendal, 1980
 English Word-Formation, Cambridge University Press, 1983
 Introducing Linguistic Morphology, Edinburgh University Press, 1988
 Watching English Change, Longman, 1994
 Vocabulary, Routledge, 1998
 Morphological Productivity, Cambridge University Press, 2001
 An Introduction to International Varieties of English, Edinburgh University Press, 2002
 A Glossary of Morphology, Edinburgh University Press, 2004
 Language Matters, With Janet Holmes and Paul Warren, Palgrave, 2006
 The Linguistic Student's Handbook, Edinburgh University Press, 2007
 Q and Eh. Questions and answers on language with a Kiwi twist, with Dianne Bardsley, Janet Holmes & Paul Warren, Random House, 2011. [This book reprinted articles which first appeared in the Dominion Post newspaper from October 2007]
 Beginning Linguistics, Palgrave Macmillan, 2012
 The Oxford Reference Guide to English Morphology, with Rochelle Lieber and Ingo Plag, Oxford University Press, 2013
 Compounds and Compounding, Cambridge University Press, 2017
 Rethinking Morphology, Edinburgh University Press, 2019

See also
Peter Hugoe Matthews
Heinz Giegerich

References

External links
 Laurie Bauer at Victoria University of Wellington

1949 births
Living people
Linguists from England
Phonologists
Morphologists
Phoneticians
Alumni of the University of Edinburgh
Academic staff of the Victoria University of Wellington
Academic staff of Odense University
Linguists of English
Fellows of the Royal Society of New Zealand
Linguistics journal editors